Schieffer:

 Bob Lloyd Schieffer (born 1937), an American television journalist
 Rudolf Schieffer (1947-2018), German historian 
 Theodor Schieffer (1910 in Bad Godesberg – 1992 in Bad Godesberg), a German historian
 John Thomas "Tom" Schieffer (born 1947), an American diplomat

Schiefer is also German for slate

See also 
 Schiffer
 Schiefer

German-language surnames